Ivan Vakarchuk (6 March 1947 – 4 April 2020) was a Ukrainian and Soviet physicist, politician and social activist. From 1990 to 2007 and again between 2010 and 2013 he was Rector of the Lviv University. In 2007–2010 he was Minister of Education and Science of Ukraine. Hero of Ukraine (awarded on 5 March 2007), he was father of the leader of the rock band Okean Elzy Svyatoslav Vakarchuk.

Biography
Ivan Vakarchuk was born on 6 March 1947 in Brătușeni village (Stari Bratushany), Edineț Raion, Moldavian SSR.

Education
In 1965 Vakarchuk received his secondary education by finishing with honours a local middle school in Brătușeni. In 1965–1970 he studied at the Faculty of Physics at Lviv University named after Ivan Franko. In 1970–1973 he continued his studies at postgraduate research (aspirantura) of the Lviv section of condensed state statistical theory of the Institute of theoretical physics, affiliated with the UkrSSR Academy of Sciences (National Academy of Sciences of Ukraine).
In 1974 he defended his candidate of Sciences (PhD) thesis "Application of the method of displacements and collective variables in the study of interacting Bose particles near absolute zero", and in 1980 his doctor of Sciences thesis "Microscopic theory of Bose liquid". Ivan Vakarchuk represented the Lviv school of statistical physics founded by academician of National Academy of Sciences of Ukraine Ihor Yukhnovskyi.

Career
In 1973–1984 Ivan Vakarchuk was working at the Lviv branch of the Institute for Theoretical Physics affiliated with the UkrSSR Academy of Sciences (now is the Institute of Condensed Matter Physics of National Academy of Sciences) as junior research fellow, senior researcher and head of Quantum Statistics department.
Since 1984 he's been performing the duties of Professor, head of department of Theoretical Physics at Lviv State Ivan Franko University.
On 13 November 1990 Ivan Vakarchuk was elected the rector of Lviv State University named after Ivan Franko (current name - Lviv National University named after Ivan Franko) and worked till November 2007. Later he held this office again between 2010 and 2013. During the 2004' presidential elections, Vakarchuk openly called students to vote for Viktor Yushchenko. In 2008 he took the 50th place in the Top 100 of the most influential Ukrainians, according to Reporter magazine.
On December 18, 2007 Vakarchuk was appointed the Minister of education and science of Ukraine.

Achievements in science

Ivan Vakarchuk has the rank of Doctor of Physical and Mathematical Sciences, Professor, PhD with the thesis: "Application of the method of displacements and collective variables in the study of interacting Bose particles near absolute zero" (Institute for Theoretical Physics, Academy of Sciences of USSR, 1974) doctoral thesis on "Microscopic theory of Bose liquid" (Institute for Theoretical Physics, USSR Academy of Sciences, 1980).

A distinctive feature of professor Ivan Vakarchuk was the amplitude of his scientific interests: physics of quantum liquids, theory of phase transitions and critical phenomena, physics of disordered systems, magnetic systems, physics, mathematical methods in theoretical physics, fundamental problems of quantum mechanics and quantum computer sciences, geophysics, general relativity theory, cosmology, philosophy of science. In each of these fields he proposed new original approaches to the study of various physical phenomena and processes. The amplitude of his scientific interests allowed him to apply methods, which he invented to study different phenomena.

Ivan Vakarchuk paid particular attention to the latest achievements in science and philosophy of science issues, including the relationship between research methods of natural sciences and humanities, identifying common math mechanisms that "manage" the processes occurring in the humanitarian and social spheres.
He is the author of over 240 scientific papers, and author of the books  "Lectures on General Relativity" (1991), "Quantum Mechanics" (1998, 2004, 2007, 2012) "Introduction to the many-body problem" (1999) and "The Theory of Stellar Spectra" (2003).

Titles and awards

Activism
 Founder and Editor-in-chief of the "Journal of Physics Research" and the popular science magazine "World of Physics"
 Member of the Commission of state awards and heraldry
 Member of the Committee on State Prizes of Ukraine in science and technology
 Vice-President of the Union of rectors of higher educational establishments of Ukraine
 Member of the editorial board of the journal "Higher Education in Ukraine"
 Chairman of the board of the Lviv Regional Peace Council
 President of the Ukrainian Physical Society
 Member of the Council on Science and Science and Technology Policy under the President of Ukraine
 Member of the organizing committee for the preparation and celebration of the 1020th anniversary of Baptism of Kyivan Rus

Awards and titles
Order of Merit, 3rd class (February 2005)
Hero of Ukraine (Order of State, 2007)
 Honour Badge of the President of Ukraine (1996)
 Merited Functionary of Science and Technology of Ukraine (2006)
 State Prize of Ukraine in Science and Technology (2000)
 Honorary Doctor of the Cracow Pedagogical Academy
 Honorary Doctor of University of Wrocław
 Recipient of the Barabashov Prize of the National Academy of Sciences of Ukraine
 Diploma by the Presidium of the National Academy of Sciences of Ukraine "Expert of Public Education in the USSR" (1983)
 Diploma of Merit by the Academy of Sciences of the Ukrainian SSR (1977, 1981)

Personal life

Family

Ivan Vakarchuk was married, his wife Svetlana (b. 1947) is teacher of physics, assistant professor of Lviv National Academy of veterinary medicine named after S.Gzhitsky. 
They had two sons: Svyatoslav Vakarchuk (b. 1975), who is a Ukrainian politician and frontman of "Okean Elzy", the famous Ukrainian rock band, and Oleg (b. 1980) - a bank employee.

Death
Vakarchuk died on 4 April 2020, at the age of 73 in Lviv. The causes of death was not reported.

References

External links 
 Biography of Professor Ivan Vakarchuk at the official web site of Lviv National University

1947 births
2020 deaths
Education and science ministers of Ukraine
Chevaliers of the Order of Merit (Ukraine)
People from Edineț District
Moldovan emigrants to Ukraine
20th-century Ukrainian physicists
University of Lviv alumni
Recipients of the title of Hero of Ukraine
People of the Euromaidan
University of Lviv rectors
Soviet physicists
Laureates of the State Prize of Ukraine in Science and Technology